Trastenik is a village in the municipality of Ivanovo, in the Ruse Province of Bulgaria.

The village is around 25 km away from the city center of Ruse. The main road E 85 connects the village. Agriculture is well developed in the village, with crop production being the dominant sector - the main production of cereals. Cattle breeding and sheep breeding are well developed in stockbreeding. There are favorable conditions for the development of beekeeping in the countryside.

In 2020 the population was 1485.

References

Villages in Ruse Province